Karuppaih Palaniappan, credited on-screen as Karu Palaniappan, is an Indian film director, actor, and television host who works in the Tamil film industry. He has also hosted the show Thamizha Thamizha on Zee Tamil.

Biography
Palaniappan hails from Karaikudi. His parents are Chinna Karuppaiya and Thirumathi Naagammai, and Palaniappan is the eldest among their three children.

Books appealed to Palaniappan right from childhood. His father Chinna Karuppiah, a trader, is an ardent reader. He showed interest in reading classics of popular writers like Kannadasan, Jayakanthan, and Ashokamitran. Following the saying ‘Like father like son’, Palaniappan inherited this ‘love of reading’ from his father right from childhood.

Palaniappan's passion for reading books spread its wings to learning languages, writing, acting and elocution. His innate style of starting midway through a debate and expressing his thoughts with eloquence, charismatically grabbing the attention of the audience and keeping them spellbound, winning their applause and admiration presented him with countless trophies, certificates and accolades.

After his schooling in Madurai Seventh Day Adventist, Palaniappan studied English Literature in the renowned American College, Madurai (undergrad) and mastered in Literature in Madurai Thiyagaraja College. His intense pursuit of Tamil literature secured him the covetable student training course in Vikatan Group of Magazines.

Palaniappan sustained reading and movie-watching with zest and zeal created an affiliation to cinema within himself, thus inspiring his first toddler steps into Kollywood in 1994. Though he is acclaimed as director Parthiban's protégé, Palaniappan worked under two other directors. With Parthiban, he worked in Pullakuttikaran and Housefull. His grey cells contributed to director Dharani's stories that did not get transformed into films in the sandwiched time frame between the latter's films Edhirum Pudhirum and Dhill. He worked under director Ezhil in Thulladha Manamum Thullum, Pennin Manathai Thottu, and Poovellam Un Vasam.

Career
Palaniappan's directorial debut was Parthiban Kanavu, starring Srikanth and Sneha. The film become one of the biggest hits of the year. Palaniappan's second film, Sivappathigaram, starring Vishal, released in 2006 and fared well at the box office. His 2008 film Pirivom Santhippom got major attention of the family audience. His fourth directorial film, Mandhira Punnagai, saw him making his debut as a hero. His second film with Srikanth called Sadhurangam, was finished in 2006 and remained unreleased for a long time. At last, the film released in 2011. Srikanth's character in the film was named after Thirupathisamy, Palaniappan's close friend who died in 2001. He directed the 2013 film Jannal Oram, a remake of the Malayalam film Ordinary. 2019 saw him acting in a negative role in the movie Natpe Thunai.

Unfinished projects
In 2005, Palaniappan began work on a film with Dhanush and Gopika in lead roles, titled Ashokamithran, but the film ran  production troubles and was subsequently shelved. He later began work on that film in 2012 with a new crew and Arulnithi in the lead role; however, after two months of shooting, the film was again cancelled. The director and actor tried to revive the project in late 2013, but were again unsuccessful. Likewise, another project, a family drama Pandiya Vamsam starring Ameer and Rajkiran, was called off soon after production started.

In 2016, Palaniappan spent time on pre-production for a film titled Gramophone featuring Madhavan and Rajkiran in the lead roles. Despite working on it for a year, the film failed to materialise owing to Madhavan's busy schedule. In September 2017, he announced his next film would be a political thriller film titled Pugazhenthi Enum Naan featuring Arulnithi and Bindu Madhavi.

Personal life
Palaniappan is married to Pia and has two children, Iniya (daughter) and Dhaya (son).

Filmography

Television

Awards
 Best Director Award
Tamil Nadu State Film Award for Best Director for Parthiban Kanavu  – 2003

 Best Story Writer Award
Tamil Nadu State Film Award for 
Sadhurangam – 2011

References

External links
 

Tamil film directors
Living people
People from Sivaganga district
Tamil Nadu State Film Awards winners
1972 births
21st-century Indian film directors